R.M.K. Engineering College (RMKEC) is a private engineering college at Kavaraipettai, Gummidipoondi Taluk, Tamil Nadu, India, governed by the Lakshmikanthammal Educational Trust. It is affiliated to Anna University, Chennai, and accredited by All India Council for Technical Education(AICTE) with A+ Grade (3.52/4.00). All the seven departments of the college are accredited by the National Board of Accreditation(NBA). RMKEC is among the top engineering colleges of Anna University in Tamil Nadu and a Tier-I institution among self-financing colleges. It is a minority institution under language category. The college got autonomous status for a period of 10 years from the session 2020-2021 to 2029-2030

History 
Opened in 1995 with three departments -- Electrical and Electronics Engineering, Computer Science and Engineering, Electronics and Communication Engineering, and Mechanical Engineering, the college is located in Kavaraipettai - a town in Gummidipoondi Taluk of Thiruvallur district. In addition to offering Bachelor's and Master's degrees in most of the engineering departments, the college also offers a Master's degree in Computer Applications (MCA) and Business Administration (MBA). The campus is spread across 60 acres. The college has a fleet of 80 buses for transportation of students. The number of students per class is 40 till second year to maintain a healthy Student to Faculty ratio. From the second year onwards the students per class is 60.

Courses Offered

Bachelor's Degree
B.E. in Civil Engineering
B.E. in Computer Science and Engineering
B.E. in Electrical and Electronics Engineering
B.E. in Electronics and Communication Engineering
B.E. in Electronics and Instrumentation Engineering
B.Tech. in Information Technology
B.E. in Mechanical Engineering.

Awards and recognitions
 The college is certified by DNV Netherlands as ISO 9001:2008 compliant.
 The college has been awarded "Bharatiya Vidya Bhavan National Award for an Engineering College having Best Overall Performance" by the Indian Society for Technical Education (ISTE) for 2008.

Rankings

The National Institutional Ranking Framework (NIRF) ranked it 155 among engineering colleges in 2020.

RMKy:

 RM

 RMKdu

References

External links
 RMK Engineering College Official Site

Private engineering colleges in Tamil Nadu
Colleges affiliated to Anna University
Education in Tiruvallur district
Educational institutions established in 1995
1995 establishments in Tamil Nadu